The Saint Petersburg Philharmonic Orchestra (Symphonic Orchestra of the Saint Petersburg Philharmonia) is a Russian orchestra based in Saint Petersburg, at the Saint Petersburg Philharmonia.

History
The roots of the orchestra date back to 1802, with the founding of the Saint Petersburg Philharmonic Society that year.  The orchestra was initially known as the Imperial Music Choir, and performed for the Court of Alexander III of Russia.  By the 1900s, the Orchestra started to give public performances at the Philharmonia and elsewhere in Russia.

After the  Russian Revolution, the Orchestra was taken over by the members and the name was changed to the State Philharmonic Orchestra of Petrograd.  In the 1920s, the orchestra began receiving support from the State, and began to be known internationally.  Its guest conductors included Bruno Walter, Ernest Ansermet, and Hans Knappertsbusch.  Following the renaming of Petrograd to Leningrad after the death of Vladimir Lenin, the orchestra was renamed the Leningrad Philharmonic Orchestra.

The orchestra gained its most fame under the chief conductorship of Yevgeny Mravinsky, from 1938 to 1988. It made few tours to the West, and the first tour was to Finland in the spring of 1946.  The orchestra and Mravinsky made a number of studio recordings, and various archival live recordings have since subsequently been commercially released.  Under Mravinsky's direction, the orchestra premiered seven of Shostakovich's symphonies.

In 1991, the orchestra was renamed the Saint Petersburg Philharmonic Orchestra.  Yuri Temirkanov has served as artistic director of the orchestra since 1988, and was its chief conductor from 1988, after the death of Mravinsky, until January 2022.  On 21 January 2022, Nikolai Alexeev became chief conductor of the orchestra.

Chief conductors

 Hermann Fliege (1882–1907)
  (1907–1917)
 Serge Koussevitzky (1917–1920)
 Emil Cooper (1920–1923)
  (1924–1926)
 Nikolai Malko (1926–1930)
 Aleksandr Gauk (1930–1934)
 Fritz Stiedry (1934–1937)
 Yevgeny Mravinsky (1938–1988)
 Yuri Temirkanov (1988–2022)
 Nikolai Alekseev (2022–present)

See also
 Saint Petersburg Academic Symphony Orchestra

References

External links
 Official page of the Saint Petersburg Philharmonic Orchestra
 
 Article at Bach-Cantatas.com
 Leningrad Philharmonic Orchestra, discography at Naxos Records

1882 establishments in the Russian Empire
Russian symphony orchestras
Culture in Saint Petersburg
Musical groups established in 1882